Nace Kosmač (born 6 September 1986) is a Slovenian football forward who plays for Tabor Sežana.

References

1993 births
Living people
Slovenian footballers
Association football forwards
NK Primorje players
NK Domžale players
Slovenian PrvaLiga players
Slovenian expatriate footballers
Slovenia under-21 international footballers